This is an incomplete list of Laws, Ordinances and Orders in Council of the States of Guernsey.

Guernsey passes between 30 and 60 laws a year.

20th century

1935

 Registration of Births and Deaths (Guernsey) Law, 1935

1939

 Matrimonial Causes (Guernsey) Law 1939

1948

 Interpretation (Guernsey) Law, 1948
 Reform (Guernsey) Law, 1948

1952

 Saisie Procedure (Simplification) (Bailiwick of Guernsey) Order, 1952

1954

 Stay of Evictions (Amendment) Law, 1954

1961

 Court of Appeal (Guernsey) Law, 1961

1963

 Offences against Police Officers (Bailiwick of Guernsey) Law, 1963

1964

 Court of Appeal (Civil Division) (Guernsey) Rules, 1964

1966

 Husband and Wife (Joint Accounts) (Guernsey) Law, 1966
 Island Development (Guernsey) Law, 1966

1969

 Court of Alderney (Appeals) Law, 1969
 Trusts (Guernsey) Law, 1969

1972

 Customs and Excise (General Provisions) (Bailiwick of Guernsey) Law, 1972

1973

 European Communities (Bailiwick of Guernsey) Law, 1973

1974

 Misuse of Drugs (Bailiwick of Guernsey) Law, 1974

1975

 Income Tax (Guernsey) Law, 1975

1979

 Law of Property (Miscellaneous Provisions) (Guernsey) Law, 1979
 Law Reform (Tort) (Guernsey) Law, 1979

1982

 Arbitration (Guernsey) Law 1982

1985

 Preuves, Loi relative aux 1985

1986

 The Census Ordinance, 1986	
 The Public Transport (Guernsey) Law, 1984 (Commencement) Ordinance, 1986
 The Public Transport Ordinance, 1986 
 The Road Traffic (Permits to Drive Public Service Vehicles) Ordinance, 1986	
 The Impôts (Budget) Ordinance, 1986	
 The Vehicle Noises etc. Ordinance, 1986	
 The Mooring Charges (Amendment) (Guernsey) Ordinance, 1986

1987

 The Income Tax (Guernsey) (Settlements) Ordinance, 1987
 The Pilotage Dues and Fees Ordinance, 1987	
 The Harbours, Moorings and Pilotage (Fees and Dues) Law, 1986 (Commencement) Ordinance, 1987
 The Health and Safety at Work (General)(Ordinance), 1987
 Law Reform (Miscellaneous Provisions) (Guernsey) Law, 1987
 Real Property (Reform) (Guernsey) Law, 1987

1988

 The Electoral Expenditure (People's Deputies) Ordinance, 1988
 The Electoral Expenditure (Constables and Douzeniers) Ordinances, 1988
 The Fishing (Amendment) Ordinance, 1988
 Domestic Proceedings and Magistrate's Court (Guernsey) Law, 1988

1989

 The Liquor Licensing (Amendment) Ordinance, 1989
 The Drug Trafficking Offences (Bailiwick of Guernsey) Law, 1988 (Commencement) Ordinance, 1989
 The Bank Holidays (Amendment) (Guernsey) Ordinance, 1989
 Curatelle Rules 1989
 Fire Services (Guernsey) Law, 1989
 Fishing (Bailiwick of Guernsey) Law, 1989
 Parole Review Committee (Guernsey) Law, 1989
 Royal Court Civil Rules, 1989
 Trusts (Guernsey) Law, 1989

1990

 The Foreshore (Riding and Driving) (Amendment) Ordinance, 1990
 The Gambling (Channel Islands Lottery) (Bailiwick of Guernsey) (Amendment) Ordinance, 1990
 Housing (Control of Occupation)(Amendment)(Guernsey), 1990
 Right to Work (Limitation and Proof)(Guernsey) Law, 1990

1991

 The Parole Review Committee Ordinance, 1991
 The Companies Law (Commencement) Ordinance, 1991
 The Births, Deaths and Marriage (Fees) (Amendment) Ordinance, 1991
 Criminal Justice (Fraud Investigation) (Bailiwick of Guernsey) Law 1991

1992

 The Income Tax (Forms of Oath) Ordinance, 1992
 The Income Tax (Settlements) (Guernsey) Ordinance, 1992
 The Marriage Fees (Amendment) Ordinance, 1992

1993

 The Water Charges (Amendment) Ordinance, 1993	
 The Vehicular Traffic (Control of Parking on certain States Land) (Amendment) Ordinance, 1993
 The Prohibited and One-way Streets (Amendment) Ordinance, 1993
 Rent Control (Amendment)(Guernsey) Law, 1993
 Security Interests (Guernsey) Law, 1993

1994

 The Public Holidays Ordinance, 1994
 The Housing (Control of Occupation) (Variation of Schedules) Ordinance, 1994
 The Special Constabulary (Amendment) (No. 2) Ordinance, 1993
 Housing (Control of Occupation)(Guernsey) Law, 1994
 European Communities (Implementation) (Bailiwick of Guernsey) Law 1994
 Ecclesiastical Court (Jurisdiction) (Bailiwick of Guernsey) Law, 1994

1995

 The Income Tax (Exempt Bodies: Guernsey Limited Partnerships) Ordinance,	 1995
 The Patents, Designs & Trade Marks (Amendment) Ordinance, 1995
 The Post Office Board (Chief Executive) Ordinance, 1995
 Partnership (Guernsey) Law, 1995

1996

 The Food and Drugs (Amendment) (Guernsey) Law, 1995 (Commencement) Ordinance, 1996
 The Food and Drugs (Emergency Prohibition Notice) (Maximum Compensation) Ordinance, 1996
 The Alderney (Application of Legislation) (Food and Drugs) Ordinance, 1996
 The Royal Bank of Scotland (Bailiwick of Guernsey) Law, 1995, (Commencement) Ordinance, 1996
 The Limited Partnerships (Guernsey) Law, 1995 (Commencement) Ordinance, 1996
 The Income Tax (Exempt Bodies: Limited Partnerships) Ordinance, 1996
 Fishing (Sark) Ordinance, 1996

1997

 The Employers’ Liability (Compulsory Insurance) (Subsidiary Companies) Ordinance, 1997
 The Housing (Control of Occupation) (Amendment of Housing Register)	 Ordinance, 1997
 The Magistrate's Court and Miscellaneous Reforms (Guernsey) Law, 1996 (Commencement) (No. 2) Ordinance 1997
 The Sale of Tobacco (Amendment) Ordinance, 1997
 The Protected Cell Companies Ordinance, 1997
 Amalgamation of Companies Ordinance, 1997
 Migration of Companies Ordinance, 1997

1998

 The Health Service (Physiotherapy Benefit) Ordinance, 1997
 The Alderney (Application of Legislation) (Health Service) (Benefit) (Amendment) Ordinance, 1997
 The By-elections Ordinance, 1998
 Housing (Control of Occupation)(Amendment)(Guernsey) Law, 1998
 Employment Protection (Guernsey) Law, 1998

1999

 The Public (Highways (Temporary Closure) Ordinance, 1999
 The Gambling (Betting) (Amendment) Ordinance, 1999	
 The Road Traffic (Speed Limits and Trials) (Amendment) Ordinance, 1999 
 The Transfrontier Shipment of Waste Ordinance, 1999 
 The Firearms (Guernsey) Law, 1998 (Commencement) Ordinance, 1999
 Criminal Justice (Proceeds of Crime) (Bailiwick of Guernsey) Law, 1999

21st century

2000

 The Alderney (Application of Legislation) (Child Protection) Ordinance, 2000	 
 The Electoral expenditure Ordinance, 2000 
 The Driving Tests and Driving Licences (Increase of Fees) Ordinance, 2000
 The Supplementary Benefit (Implementation) (Amendment) Ordinance, 2000	
 The Data Protection (Office of Commissioner) Ordinance, 2000
 The Human Rights (Bailiwick of Guernsey) Law, 2000
 The Landmines Act 1998 (Guernsey) Order 2000

2001

Data Protection (Bailiwick of Guernsey) Law, 2001
Electricity (Guernsey) Law, 2001
Electricity (Guernsey) Law, 2001 (Commencement and Amendment) Ordinance, 2001
Housing (Control of Occupation)(Amendment)(Guernsey) Law, 2001
Post Office (Bailiwick of Guernsey) Law, 2001
Post Office (Bailiwick of Guernsey) Law, 2001 (Commencement) Ordinance, 2001
Post Office (Bailiwick of Guernsey) (Amendment) Ordinance, 2001
Regulation of Utilities (Bailiwick of Guernsey) Law, 2001
States Trading Companies (Bailiwick of Guernsey) Law, 2001
States Trading Companies (Bailiwick of Guernsey) Ordinance, 2001
Telecommunications (Bailiwick of Guernsey) Law, 2001
Telecommunications (Bailiwick of Guernsey) Law, 2001 (Commencement) Ordinance, 2001
Transfer of States Undertakings (Protection of Employment) (Guernsey) Law, 2001
The Limited Partnerships (Guernsey) (Amendment) Law, 1997	(Commencement) Ordinance 2001

2002

Criminal Evidence and Miscellaneous Provisions (Bailiwick of Guernsey) Law, 2002
Rehabilitation of Offenders (Bailiwick of Guernsey) Law, 2002
States Trading Companies (Bailiwick of Guernsey) (Amendment) Ordinance, 2002

2003

 States Audit Commission (Guernsey) (Amendment) Ordinance 2003
 The European Communities (Implementation of Council Regulation for Control of Exports of Dual-Use Items) (Guernsey) Ordinance 2003
 Sea Fish Licensing (Guernsey) Ordinance, 2003
 Control of Borrowing (Bailiwick of Guernsey) (Amendment) Ordinance, 2003
 Feudal Dues (General Abolition of Congé) (Guernsey) Law, 2002 (Commencement) Ordinance, 2003
 Document Duty Ordinance, 2003	
 Long-term Care Insurance (Guernsey) (Rates and Transitional Provisions) Ordinance, 2003
 Supplementary Benefit (Implementation) (Amendment) Ordinance, 2003 
 Bar (Amendment) Ordinance, 2003
 Health Service (Benefit) (Amendment) Ordinance, 2003 
 Water Byelaws (Guernsey) Ordinance, 2003	
 By-election (Vale) Ordinance, 2003
 Liquor Licensing (Amendment) Ordinance, 2003
 Reform (Guernsey) (Amendment) Law, 2003 (Commencement) Ordinance, 2003
 Housing (Control of Occupation) (Amendment of Housing Register) Ordinance, 2003
 Guernsey Gambling Control Commission (Casino Gaming) (Fees) Ordinance,	 2003
 Harbours (Amendment) Ordinance, 2003
 European Communities (Bailiwick of Guernsey) (Amendment) Ordinance, 2003
 By-election (Saint Sampson) Ordinance, 2003
 Social Insurance (Rates of Contributions and Benefits, etc.) Ordinance, 2003
 Police Powers and Criminal Evidence (Bailiwick of Guernsey) Law, 2003

2004

 Housing (Control of Occupation) (Suspension of Provisions of Section 65) Ordinance, 2004
 Health Service (Benefit) (Amendment) (No. 3) Ordinance, 2003
 Reform (Amendment) (Guernsey) Law, 1972 (Amendment) Ordinance, 2004
 Regulation of Investigatory Powers (Bailiwick of Guernsey) Law, 2003 (Commencement) Ordinance, 2004
 Burma (Export of Goods and Freezing of Funds) (Amendment) Ordinance, 2004
 The Elections Ordinance, 2004 - 2004 Guernsey general election
 Police Powers and Criminal Evidence (Bailiwick of Guernsey) Law, 2003 (Commencement) Ordinance, 2004
 Bail (Bailiwick of Guernsey) Law, 2003, (Commencement) Ordinance, 2004
 Notice of Smoking in Public Places Ordinance, 2004
 Sale of Tobacco (Amendment) Ordinance, 2004
 States Housing (Tenancies, Rent and Rebate Scheme)(Guernsey) Law, 2004
 States Housing (Tenancies, Rent and Rebate Scheme)(Guernsey) Law, 2004 (Consolidated Text)

2005

 The Burma (Sale, Supply, Export, Technical Assistance, Financing and Financial Assistance and Shipment of Equipment) (Penalties and Licences) (Guernsey) (Amendment) Ordinance, 2004
 The Bar (Amendment) Ordinance, 2005	
 The States Housing (Termination of Tenancies) (Guernsey) Ordinance, 2005

2006

 Companies (Fees and Penalties) Ordinance, 2006
 Companies (Purchase of Own Shares) (Treasury Shares) Ordinance, 2006
 Housing (Control of Occupation)(Guernsey)(Amendment) Law, 2006
 Incorporated Cell Companies Ordinance, 2006
 Protected Cell Companies (Amendment) Ordinance, 2006
 Criminal Justice (Miscellaneous Provisions) (Bailiwick of Guernsey) Law 2006

2007

 The Motor Tax (Abolition) (Guernsey) Ordinance, 2006
 The European Communities (Bailiwick of Guernsey) (Amendment) Ordinance,	 2006
 The Regulation of Utilities (Bailiwick of Guernsey) Ordinance, 2007
 The Registered Plant Breeders’ Rights (Bailiwick of Guernsey) Ordinance, 2007

2008

 The Income Tax (Tax Relief on Interest Payments) (Guernsey) Ordinance, 2007
 The Financial Services Commission (Site Visits) (Bailiwick of Guernsey) Ordinance, 2008
 The Migration of Companies (Amendment) Ordinance, 2008	
 The Amalgamation of Companies (Amendment) Ordinance, 2008
 The Protected Cell Companies (Amendment) Ordinance, 2008
 The Royal Court (Reform) Law 2008
 The Incorporated Cell Companies (Amendment) Ordinance, 2008
 Children (Guernsey and Alderney) Law 2008
 Companies (Guernsey) Law 2008

2009

 The Registered Patents and Biotechnological Inventions (Bailiwick of Guernsey) Ordinance, 2009
 The Income Tax (Guernsey) (Approval of Agreements) Ordinance, 2009	
 The Guernsey Bar (Bailiwick of Guernsey) (Commencement) Ordinance, 2009	
 The Merchant Shipping (Bailiwick of Guernsey) Law, 2002 (Commencement) Ordinance, 2009
 The Aviation (Bailiwick of Guernsey) Law, 2008 (Commencement) Ordinance,	 2009
 The Aviation (Foreign Aircraft Operations) (Bailiwick of Guernsey) Ordinance,	 2009

2010

 Income Tax (Guernsey) (Approval of Agreement with Australia) Ordinance, 2010
 Data Protection (Bailiwick of Guernsey) (Amendment) Ordinance, 2010	
 Milk (Control) (Guernsey) (Amendment) Ordinance, 2010
 Vehicular Traffic (Amendment) Ordinance, 2010
 Driving Licences (Guernsey) (Amendment) Ordinance, 2010

2011

 Income Tax (Guernsey) (Approval of Agreements with San Marino, Greece and China) Ordinance, 2011
 Iran (Restrictive Measures) (Guernsey) Ordinance, 2010	
 Foreign Tax (Retention Arrangements) (Guernsey and Alderney) (Amendment) Ordinance, 2010
 Fees, Charges and Penalties (Guernsey) (Amendment) Ordinance, 2010	
 Machinery of Government (Transfer of Functions) (Guernsey) Ordinance, 2011
 The Electoral Roll Ordinance, 2011

2012

 The Income Tax (Guernsey) (Approval of Agreements with the Czech Republic and Slovenia) Ordinance, 2012
 The Terrorist Asset-Freezing (Bailiwick of Guernsey) Law, 2011 (Commencement) Ordinance, 2012
 The Animal Welfare (Guernsey) Ordinance, 2012
 The Housing (Control of Occupation) (Amendment of Housing Register)	 Ordinance, 2012
 The Inheritance (Guernsey) Law, 2011 (Commencement) Ordinance, 2012

2013

 The Income Tax (Guernsey) (Approval of Agreement with Malta) Ordinance,	2013
 The Civil Contingencies Law, 2012 (Commencement) (Bailiwick of Guernsey)	 Ordinance, 2013
 The Civil Contingencies Authority (Form of Oath and Affirmation) (Bailiwick of Guernsey) Ordinance, 2013
 The Merchant Shipping (Bailiwick of Guernsey) Law, 2002, (Commencement)	 Ordinance, 2013
 The Smoking (Prohibition in Public Places and Workplaces) (Exemptions and Notices) (Amendment) (Guernsey) Ordinance, 2013
 The Income Tax (Guernsey) (Approval of Agreement with Chile) Ordinance, 2013
 The Control of Borrowing (Repeal) (Bailiwick of Guernsey) Ordinance, 2013
 The Income Tax (Zero 10) (Company Intermediate Rate) (Amendment) (Guernsey) Ordinance, 2012
 The Mental Health (Bailiwick of Guernsey) Law, 2010 (Commencement)	 Ordinance, 2013
 The Criminal Justice (Miscellaneous Provisions) (Bailiwick of Guernsey) (Amendment) Ordinance, 2013
 The Rehabilitation of Offenders (Bailiwick of Guernsey) (Amendment) Ordinance, 2013
 The Egypt (Freezing of Funds) (Guernsey) (Amendment) Ordinance, 2013
 The Iran (Restrictive Measures) (Guernsey) (Amendment) Ordinance, 2013	
 The Tunisia (Freezing of Funds) (Guernsey) (Amendment) Ordinance, 2013
 The Income Tax (Guernsey) (Approval of Agreements with Brazil, Isle of Man, Jersey, Mauritius and Singapore) Ordinance, 2013
 The Mental Health (Miscellaneous Provisions) (Guernsey and Alderney) Ordinance, 2013
 The Income Tax (Guernsey) (Approval of Agreement with Qatar) Ordinance, 2013
 The North Korea (Restrictive Measures) (Guernsey) (Amendment) Ordinance,	 2013
 The Supplementary Benefit (Classes of persons to whom the Law applies) (Amendment) Ordinance, 2013
 The Employment Agencies (Enabling Provisions) (Bailiwick of Guernsey) Law,	 2012 (Commencement) (Guernsey and Alderney) Ordinance, 2013
 The Foreign Tax (Retention Arrangements) (Guernsey and Alderney) (Amendment) Ordinance, 2013
 The Myanmar/Burma (Restrictive Measures) (Guernsey) Ordinance, 2013
 The Income Tax (Guernsey) (Approval of Agreements with Botswana, British Virgin Islands, Hong Kong, Lesotho, Lithuania and Luxembourg) Ordinance, 2013
 The Libya (Restrictive Measures) (Guernsey) (Amendment) Ordinance, 2013 The Document Duty (Amendment) Ordinance, 2013	XXV
 The Excise Duties (Budget) Ordinance, 2013
 The Property Tax (Rates) (Guernsey and Alderney) Ordinance, 2013
 The Seafarer Recruitment and Placement Services (Maritime Labour Convention 2006) (Guernsey and Alderney) Ordinance, 2013
 The Prison (Guernsey) Ordinance, 2013	
 The Electronic Census (Guernsey) Ordinance, 2013
 The Companies (Guernsey) Law, 2008 (Amendment) Ordinance, 2013
 The Housing (Control of Occupation) (Extension) Ordinance, 2013	
 The Copyright and Performers' Rights (Bailiwick of Guernsey) (Amendment) Ordinance, 2013
 The Health Service (Benefit) (Nurse Prescribers) Ordinance, 2013 The Long-term Care Insurance (Guernsey) (Rates) Ordinance, 2013 
 The Health Service (Benefit) (Amendment) Ordinance, 2013
 The Social Insurance (Rates of Contributions and Benefits etc.) Ordinance, 2013
 The Attendance and Invalid Care Allowances Ordinance, 2013
 The Supplementary Benefit (Implementation) (Amendment) Ordinance, 2013
 The Parochial Administration Ordinance, 2013
 The Medicines (Human and Veterinary) (Bailiwick of Guernsey) Law, 2008 (Commencement and Amendment) Ordinance, 2013
 The Health Service (Specialist Medical Benefit) (Amendment) Ordinance,	 2013
 The Chief Accountant (Transfer of Functions) (Guernsey) Ordinance, 2013 
 The Al-Qaida (Restrictive Measures) (Guernsey) Ordinance, 2013

2014

 Income Tax (Approved International Agreements) (Implementation) (Guernsey) Ordinance, 2013
 The Syria (Restrictive Measures) (Guernsey) (Amendment) Ordinance, 2013
 The North Korea (Restrictive Measures) (Guernsey) (Amendment) (No.2)	 Ordinance, 2013
 The Competition (Guernsey) (Amendment) Ordinance, 2014
 Income Tax (Guernsey) (Approval of Agreements with Bermuda, Gibraltar, Hungary, Slovakia, Swaziland and Switzerland) Ordinance, 2014
 The Al-Qaida (Restrictive Measures) (Guernsey) (Amendment) Ordinance, 2013
 The European Communities (Implementation of Council Regulation on Nutrition and Health Claims) (Guernsey) Ordinance, 2014
 The European Communities (Implementation of Food Supplements Directive) (Guernsey) Ordinance, 2014
 The Alderney (Application of Legislation) (Food and Drugs) Ordinance, 2014
 The Protection of Investors (Limitation of Liability) (Bailiwick of Guernsey) Ordinance, 2014
 The Aviation Registry (Guernsey) (Amendment) Ordinance, 2014
 The States Trading Companies (Bailiwick of Guernsey) (Amendment) Ordinance, 2014
 The Income Tax (Guernsey) (Amendment) Ordinance, 2014
 The Electronic Transactions (Obligation to Use Electronic Form) (Guernsey) Ordinance, 2014
 The Severe Disability Benefit and Carer's Allowance (Guernsey) Law, 2013 (Commencement) Ordinance, 2014
 The Disclosure (Bailiwick of Guernsey) (Amendment) Ordinance, 2014
 The Criminal Justice (Proceeds of Crime) (Bailiwick of Guernsey) (Amendment) Ordinance, 2014
 The Drug Trafficking (Bailiwick of Guernsey) (Amendment) Ordinance, 2014
 The European Communities (Bailiwick of Guernsey) (Amendment) Ordinance,	 2014
 The Income Tax (Tax Relief on Interest Payments) (Guernsey) (Amendment)
 Ordinance, 2014 The Ukraine (Restrictive Measures) (Guernsey) Ordinance, 2014
 The Territorial Integrity etc. of Ukraine (Restrictive Measures) (Guernsey) Ordinance, 2014
 The Central African Republic (Restrictive Measures) (Guernsey) Ordinance, 2014
 The Income Tax (Guernsey) (Approval of Agreements with Costa Rica, Mauritius, the Seychelles, the United States of America and the United Kingdom) Ordinance, 2014
 The Supplementary Benefit (Implementation) (Amendment) Ordinance, 2014	
 The Alderney (Application of Legislation) (Supplementary Benefit) (Amendment) Ordinance, 2014
 The Housing (Control of Occupation) (Amendment of Housing Register)	 Ordinance, 2014
 The Income Tax (Guernsey) (Approval of Agreement with Monaco)	 Ordinance, 2014
 The Terrorism and Crime (Bailiwick of Guernsey) (Amendment) Ordinance, 2014
 The Banking Deposit Compensation Scheme (Bailiwick of Guernsey) (Amendment) Ordinance, 2014
 The Income Tax (Guernsey) (Approved International Agreements) (Amendment) Ordinance, 2014
 The Alderney eGambling (Operations in Guernsey) (Amendment) Ordinance,	 2014
 The Crimea and Sevastopol (Restrictive Measures) (Guernsey) Ordinance, 2014
 The Afghanistan (Restrictive Measures) (Guernsey) (Amendment) Ordinance,	 2014
 The Ukraine (Restrictive Measures) (Guernsey) (Amendment) Ordinance, 2014
 The Territorial Integrity etc. of Ukraine (Restrictive Measures) (Guernsey) (Amendment) Ordinance, 2014
 The Central African Republic (Restrictive Measures) (Guernsey) (Amendment) Ordinance, 2014
 The Sudan (Restrictive Measures) (Guernsey) Ordinance, 2014
 The South Sudan (Restrictive Measures) (Guernsey) Ordinance, 2014
 The Excise Duties (Budget) Ordinance, 2014
 The Property Tax (Rates) (Guernsey and Alderney) Ordinance, 2014
 The Public Health (Amendment) Ordinance, 2014
 The Wastewater Charges (Guernsey) Ordinance, 2014	
 The Russian Federation (Restrictive Measures) Guernsey Ordinance, 2014	
 The Social Insurance (Rates of Contributions and Benefits, etc.) Ordinance, 2014 
 The Health Service (Benefit) (Amendment) Ordinance, 2014	
 The Long-term Care Insurance (Guernsey) (Rates) Ordinance, 2014
 The Supplementary Benefit (Implementation) (Amendment) (No. 2) Ordinance, 2014
 The Alderney (Application of Legislation) (Supplementary Benefit)	 (Amendment) (No. 2) Ordinance, 2014
 The Severe Disability Benefit and Carer's Allowance Ordinance, 2014
 The Tobacco Products (Guernsey) Ordinance, 2014
 The Income Tax (Guernsey) (Approval of Agreements with Cyprus, Turks and Caicos and Uruguay) Ordinance, 2014
 The Disclosure (Bailiwick of Guernsey) (Amendment) (No. 2) Ordinance, 2014
 The Terrorism and Crime (Bailiwick of Guernsey) (Amendment) (No. 2)	Ordinance, 2014
 Insurance Business (Bailiwick of Guernsey) (Amendment) Ordinance, 2014
 Housing (Control of Occupation) (Amendment of Housing Register) (No.2) Ordinance, 2014
 Health Service (Specialist Medical Benefit) (Amendment) Ordinance, 2014

2015

 The Income Tax (Guernsey) (Approval of Agreement with Macao) Ordinance,	2005
 The Air Navigation (Bailiwick of Guernsey) (Environment Standards) Ordinance, 2015
 The Income Tax (Guernsey) (Miscellaneous Amendment) Ordinance, 2014
 The Companies (Guernsey) Law, 2008 (Amendment) Ordinance, 2014
 The Driving Licences (Guernsey) (Amendment) Ordinance, 2015
 The Charities and Non Profit Organisations (Registration) (Guernsey) Law, 2008 (Amendment) Ordinance, 2014
 The Income Tax (Guernsey) (Amendment) (No.2) Ordinance, 2014
 The Income Tax (Guernsey) (Amendment) (No.3) Ordinance, 2014
 The Pilotage (Amendment) Ordinance, 2015
 The Machinery of Government (Transfer of Functions) (Guernsey) (Amendment) Ordinance, 2015
 The Criminal Justice (Sex Offenders and Miscellaneous Provisions) (Bailiwick of Guernsey) Law, 2013 (Commencement) Ordinance, 2015
 The Guernsey Financial Services Commission (Transfer of Functions) (Fees) (Bailiwick of Guernsey) Ordinance, 2015
 The Income Tax (Guernsey) (Approval of Agreement with the British Virgin Islands) Ordinance, 2015
 The Yemen (Restrictive Measures) (Guernsey) Ordinance, 2014
 The Crimea and Sevastopol (Restrictive Measures) (Guernsey) (Amendment) Ordinance, 2014
 The Cremation (Longue Hougue Facility) Ordinance, 2014
 The Financial Services Ombudsman (Bailiwick of Guernsey) (Commencement	and Amendment) Ordinance, 2015
 The Aviation Registry (Guernsey) (Interests in Aircraft) Ordinance, 2015
 The Côte d'Ivoire (Restrictive Measure) (Guernsey) Ordinance, 2015
 The Sark General Purposes and Advisory and Finance and Commerce Committees (Transfer of Functions) (Guernsey) Ordinance, 2015
 The Social Security (Reciprocal Agreement with the Republic of Chile) Ordinance, 2015
 The Regulation of Health and Professions (Medical Practitioners) (Guernsey and Alderney) Ordinance, 2015
 The Electricity (Guernsey) Law, 2001 (Amendment) Ordinance, 2015
 The Criminal Justice (Sex Offenders and Miscellaneous Provisions) (Bailiwick of Guernsey) Law, 2013 (Commencement) (No.2) Ordinance, 2015
 The Income Tax (Zero 10) (Company Intermediate Rate) (Amendment) (Guernsey) Ordinance, 2015
 The Companies (Guernsey) Law, 2008 (Amendment) Ordinance, 2015
 The Prison (Guernsey) Law, 2008 (Amendment) Ordinance, 2015
 The Parochial Administration (Miscellaneous Amendments) Law, 2014 (Commencement) Ordinance, 2015
 Loi relative aux Douits (Amendment) Law, 2013 (Commencement)	 Ordinance, 2015
 The South Sudan (Restrictive Measure) (Guernsey) Ordinance, 2015

See also 
 Law of Guernsey

External links
The Official Guernsey Government Website
 Guernsey legislation 1950 to date

Guernsey
 
Guernsey-related lists